Exist Dance was a Los Angeles based record label started by Tom Chasteen and Michael Kandel in 1991. Releasing the music of Tranquility Bass, Eden Transmission, Merge, Freaky Chakra, and more, they were part of the early development of trance, techno, breaks, and chill out music on the West Coast of the United States.

Origins 
Tom Chasteen met Michael Kandel at Cal Arts and they became friends through a shared love of music and record collecting. Kandel says, "we were both avid record collectors. We were buying everything. Our musical tastes are still very eclectic.” The two started Exist Dance after hearing early Acid House music from the UK and being drawn in by the "extreme psychedelic nature" of the genre.

Heaven Studio 
Chasteen and Kandel started a studio called "Heaven" in an industrial loft in the Skid Row district of Downtown Los Angeles. 

DJ Dan says of the studio: "In ’91, I went... there was gear everywhere. It was a hot mess. Downtown was super bombed out... You had to go through these fences to get through, and then take a lift elevator to their apartment … I remember thinking to myself, these guys are real musicians. They’re hardcore.""Heaven" played a role in the label's mythology, with "Recorded in Heaven" or "Mixed in Heaven" often appearing on release labels. The label's first compilation was called "Transmitting from Heaven", another reference to the studio space.

Style and influence 
Exist Dance releases were inspired by the Acid House sound of the Second Summer of Love, in conversation with the all night electronic music events that were happening on the West Coast of California, like Dubtribe Sound System, Wicked Sound System, their counterparts in Los Angeles such as Insomniac and other clandestine collectives. This led the label to release a mix of house, techno, trance, breaks, and downtempo, soundtracking outdoor parties which often went through sunrise into the afternoon with a diverse range of music to suit the ever changing mood of attendees. 

DJ Garth, founder of Wicked Sound System says of Exist Dance: “In 1991, there was only one West Coast label releasing the kind of music that fueled those all-night renegade parties. Their deep, psychedelic techno breakbeats were a perfect compliment to what we were doing at the time … truly a visionary label.”KCRW DJ Jason Bentley says of the labels releases:"Tom Chasteen and Mike Kandel were way ahead of their time. As far as independent dance labels and a uniquely psychedelic dance sound, it was one of the earliest links from a '60s/'70s rock aesthetic to the burgeoning dance music scene in the early '90s. They had no rule book or template. The different things they were releasing ranged in style and tempo. I think the intent just had to be sacred and transformative.”Many of the artists who released on the label were aliases for the founders' themselves. While their releases did not top the charts, they were popular among DJs playing the emerging sounds of trance, ambient house, breakbeat, and techno around the world.

Shifting Focus & Legacy 
Around 1994, Chasteen and Kandel took some time off from managing the label. The pair went their separate ways in what was "more like the parting of college roommates than a band breakup." As "a source close to the group" said to CMJ in 1997, "Mike got the band name and Tom got the label name." Kandel moved to a small island in the pacific northwest and worked for two years on the first Tranquility Bass solo LP "Let The Freak Flag Fly" which came out on Astralwerks along with three singles. Chasteen provided two remixes for the single "La La La" under the name Skull Valley. These releases were distributed widely, and received recognition and acclaim as part of a wave of downtempo, ambient house, breakbeat, big beat, and chill out music that had commercial success at the time. 

At the same time in 1997, Chasteen returned to managing Exist Dance, which would continue releasing music until around 2004. Throughout that period 12" sales were in decline, the music industry was disrupted by digital distribution, and Chasteen began focusing on other ventures. 

In 2000, Chasteen started the weekly Dub Reggae event "Dub Club" at The Echo in Echo Park Los Angeles, inviting Dub Reggae artists from around the world to perform. Chasteen regularly DJs at the event.

In 2011, Exist Dance surfaced on Bandcamp, where they issued high quality digital versions of their first compilation, as well as music from Tranquility Bass, Eden Transmission, and Voodoo Transmission previously unavailable in high quality digital formats.

In 2013, Chasteen partnered with Stones Throw Records to release new music from classic dub musicians, often acting as the mixing engineer. Besides releases under the name 'Dub Club' he also has a project called Natural Numbers which brings together Dub musicians from around the world to record, and then mixes the tracks from the mixing desk with echo and reverb in classic dubwise style. 

Exist Dance remains a document of Los Angeles' role in early 1990s global electronic music culture.

Michael Kandel died in 2015 of natural causes.

Releases 
Their complete catalogue.

12" 

 ED 001 Merge - You Move Me
 ED 002 Tranquility Bass - They Came In Peace
 ED 003 High Lonesome Sound System - Love Night
 ED 004 High Lonesome Sound System - We're Go
 ED 005 Eden Transmission - I'm So High
 ED 006 Odyssey 2000 - The Odyssey / Hop On Pop
 ED 007 Voodoo Transmission - Voodoo Fire 
 ED 008 High Lonesome Sound System - Waiting For The Lights
 ED 009 Up Above The World - Straight Up Caffeine
 ED 010 Freaky Chakra - Halucifuge
 ED 011 Up Above The World - Trying To Reach Sawaan 
 ED 012 Tranquility Bass - Broadcast Standard Issue No. 1
 ED 013 Tranquility Bass - Broadcast Standard Issue No. 2 
 ED 014 Cap'm Stargazer VS Commander Mindfuck - Untitled 
 ED 015 Off And Gone - Off And Gone
 ED 016 Commander Mindfuck / The What of Sane - Whiskey And Blood / The House That Tyler Built
 ED 017 High Lonesome Sound System - Champion Sound Remixes
 ED 018 Le Pimp - Hijack Party 
 ED 019 Ballistic Mystic - Miami 
 ED 020 Ballistic Mystic - Rock The Place 
 ED 021 Tom Chasteen - Salome
 ED 022 Skull Valley - Green Woman EP
 ED 023 Skull Valley - Granite Mountain Morning 
 ED 024 Ballistic Mystic - Imperial Cruise EP
 ED 025 Tom Chasteen - Together 
 ED 026 Tom Chasteen - Together
 ED 027 Dada Munchamonkey - The Operator
 ED 028 Heaven & Earth - The Business
 ED 029 Heaven & Earth - Very Happy 
 ED 030 Tom Chasteen - Steam Dream
 ED 031 Ballistic Mystic - Imperial Cruise Remixes
 ED 032 Dada Munchamonkey - Outside Time (Remix) 
 ED 033 The Hand - The Hand 
 ED 034 Various Artists - Musical Rampage Volume One 
 ED 035 Various Artists - Musical Rampage Volume Two 
 ED 036 Various Artists - Musical Rampage Volume Three 
 ED 037 Renee Ruffin - Now I Know 
 ED 038 Heaven & Earth - The Flippet & The Bouncet 
 ED 039 Tom Chasteen - Salome (Remixes) 
 ED 040 Tom Chasteen - Caramel Blond 
 ED 043 Tom Chasteen - Movin
 ED 044 Ballistic Mystic - Fire Burning 
 ED 045 Tom Chasteen - Clean Heart

CD 

 ED CD 001 Various Artists - Transmitting From Heaven
 ED CD 002 Dada Munchamonkey - Dada Munchamonkey
 ED CD 003 Bombshelter DJ's Emile And Radar - Future's Past 
 ED CD 004 Dada Munchamonkey - Rebaked
 ED CD 005 Various Artists - Put Your Hands Together

Digital 

 ED DD 001 Various Artists - Transmitting From Heaven 
 ED DD 002 Tranquility Bass - A Hundred Billion Stars 
 ED DD 003 Tranquility Bass - Broadcast Standard Series
 ED DD 004 Tranquility Bass - Heartbreaks & Hallelujahs 
 ED DD 005 Tranquility Bass - Mike's House
 ED DD 006 Michael Kandel, Wesley Owen - the "God Particle"
 ED DD 009 For Tourist Only: The Complete Voodoo & Eden Transmissions

References 

Record labels disestablished in 1991